"We've Got Everything" is a single by American indie band Modest Mouse and is the seventh track on their 2007 album We Were Dead Before the Ship Even Sank. James Mercer of The Shins sings backup vocals. On June 13, 2007, an animated video, directed by mtvU's Best Film on Campus Modest Mouse Video Contest winner Joe Stakun, for We've Got Everything was featured on MTV's Battle of the Videos.

References

External links
 

Modest Mouse songs
2007 singles
2007 songs
Epic Records singles
Songs written by Johnny Marr
Songs written by Isaac Brock (musician)
Songs written by Jeremiah Green
Songs written by Eric Judy
Songs written by Joe Plummer
Songs written by Tom Peloso